Kentucky Route 154 (KY 154) is a  state highway in  Campbell and Pendleton Counties, Kentucky. It runs from U.S. Route 27 (US 27) south of Claryville to KY 8 northwest of Foster.

Major intersections

References

0154
Kentucky Route 154
Kentucky Route 154